Posthuman Studios is an American game company that produces role-playing games and game supplements.

History
Catalyst Game Labs's fourth roleplaying line was Eclipse Phase (2009), the product of Posthuman Studios, a new game design studio created by Rob Boyle, Shadowrun writer Brian Cross, and graphic designer Adam Jury.

References

External links
Official site

Role-playing game publishing companies